Carolyn of the Corners is a 1919 American silent drama film directed by Robert Thornby, and starring Bessie Love, Charles Edler, and Charlotte Mineau.

The screenplay by Frank S. Beresford was based on the 1918 novel by Ruth Belmore Endicott.

The film is presumed lost.

Plot 
Young Carolyn May Cameron (Love), is orphaned when her parents are lost at sea. She and her dog Prince leave the family's Harlem flat to go to live with her uncle Joe (Edler) in Maine. She becomes friends with her uncle's former fiancee, Amanda (Mineau), and slowly helps repair their relationship.

While visiting an ill friend, Carolyn and Amanda are trapped in a forest fire. Joe rescues them, and he and Amanda fall back in love. They get married, and Carolyn decides to return to Harlem.

Once home again, she is overcome by sadness, but is interrupted by her parents, who were not actually lost at sea.

Cast 
 Bessie Love as Carolyn May Cameron
 Charles Edler as Joe Stagg
 Charlotte Mineau as Amanda Parlow
 Eunice Moore as "Aunt Rose" Kennedy

Production 
For the snow scenes, "an extra force of technical experts" were required to create the effect "in spite of the heat of the California sun."

Reception 
One reviewer praised the film for not being melodramatic, and for being suitable for and entertaining to children. Multiple reviewers cited the 20-year-old Love as being quite convincing as a child, one calling her performance "a triumph of natural acting."

Re-release 
In 1922, the film was edited down to 3 reels, and released as a "Pathé Playlet".

References

External links 

 
 
 

1919 lost films
1919 films
American black-and-white films
American silent feature films
Silent American drama films
Films based on American novels
Films directed by Robert Thornby
Films set in Maine
Films set in Manhattan
Lost American films
Lost drama films
Pathé Exchange films
1910s American films
1920s American films